Kangkung  is a village in Hsawlaw Township in Myitkyina District in the Kachin State of north-eastern Myanmar.

Climate
The climate of Kangkung is humid subtropical highland climate(Köppen climate classification Cwb). Temperatures are very pleasant throughout the year. There are only a few days above 30 °C in summer.

References

External links
Satellite map at Maplandia.com

Populated places in Kachin State
Hsawlaw Township